The Port Adelaide Football Club have drafted players through the Australian Football League's draft system, beginning with the 1996 AFL Draft. They have participated in every National Draft since then, and also participated in some Pre-season Drafts and each Rookie Draft (first held in 1997).

1996 AFL Draft

 #6  John Rombotis
 #7  Bowen Lockwood
 #9  Mark Harwood
 #37 Adam Kingsley

Trades

Uncontracted player selections 
Matthew Primus - Fitzroy
Gavin Wanganeen - Essendon
Adam Heuskes - Sydney
Ian Downsborough - West Coast Eagles

Zone Selections 
Nathan Eagleton
Tom Harley
Peter Burgoyne
Stuart Dew
Fabian Francis
Josh Francou
Roger James
Brendon Lade
Darren Mead
Nathan Steinberner
Warren Tredrea
Michael Wilson
Stephen Daniels
Donald Dickie
Paul Evans
Scott Bassett
Rhett Biglands
Tom Carr
Stephen Carter
Mark Conway
Jarrod Cotton
Nigel Fiegert
Scott Freeborn
Jake Lynch
Scott Mathews
Andrew Osborn
Darryl Poole
Damian Squire
Jonathon Yerbury

1997 AFL Draft

Pre-Season Draft

Draft picks

9 Chad Cornes
25 Nick Stevens
41 Danny Morton
57 Darren Fraser
72 Not Utilised

Trades

1998 AFL Draft

Pre-Season Draft

Draft picks 

5 Michael Stevens
7 Josh Carr
37 Adam Morgan
39 Toby Thurstans
54 Derek Murray

Trades

Rookie Elevation 

Barnaby French

References
 
 Draft history at Footywire

Draft
Port Adelaide draft